Events from the year 1360 in Ireland.

Incumbent
Lord: Edward III

Births
Mailin mac Tanaide Ó Maolconaire, Ollamh Síol Muireadaigh

Deaths
Gilla na Naem Ó Conmaigh, Irish musician
Richard FitzRalph, Archbishop of Armagh